The Methodist University College Ghana is a private university in Ghana. It is located at Accra in the Greater Accra Region. It was established in October 2000 by the Methodist Church Ghana after being granted accreditation by the National Accreditation Board in August 2000. Academic work started in November 2000 at the Wesley Grammar School campus.

Organization
The university has five faculties. Each is made up of departments which report to their respective deans.

Faculty of Business Administration
 Accounting Department
 Banking and Finance Department
 Human Resource Management and  Management Studies Department
 Marketing and Supply chain Department

Faculty of  Arts and General Studies
 Languages Department
 General Studies Department
 Religious Studies Department
 Music and Theatre Studies Department

Faculty of Social Studies
 Economics Department
 Psychology Department
 Social Work Department

Faculty of Informatics and Mathematical Sciences
 Information Technology Department
 Mathematics and Statistics Departments
 Actuarial   Science

Faculty of Applied Sciences 
 General Agriculture and Agribusiness Department.
 Agroprocessing Department
 Nursing Department.

Campuses
There are three campuses.
 Dansoman Campus: This is the main campus of the university, in an Accra suburb.
 Tema Campus: Satellite campus on the premises of the Tema Methodist Day Secondary School.
 Wenchi Campus: B.Sc. General Agriculture, Diploma in General Nursing, Certificate programmes in Agrobusiness, Agro-processing and Horticulture are run from this campus.

Affiliation
The university was officially affiliated to the University of Ghana since October 2002.

However, on Tuesday, August 30, 2022, the university was granted a presidential charter to award its own degrees.

See also
 List of universities in Ghana

Notes

External links
 National Accreditation Board
 Methodist University College Ghana
 Methodist Church Ghana

Education in Accra
Christian universities and colleges in Ghana
Educational institutions established in 2000
2000 establishments in Ghana
Methodism in Ghana
Ghana